The 21st American Society of Cinematographers Awards were held on February 18, 2007, honoring the best cinematographers of film and television in 2006.

Winners and nominees

Film
Outstanding Achievement in Cinematography in Theatrical Releases
 Emmanuel Lubezki – Children of Men
 Dick Pope – The Illusionist
 Robert Richardson – The Good Shepherd
 Dean Semler – Apocalypto
 Vilmos Zsigmond – The Black Dahlia

Television

Outstanding Achievement in Cinematography in Regular Series
 David Moxness – Smallville (Episode: "Arrow")
 Eagle Egilsson – CSI: Miami (Episode: "Darkroom")
 Nathan Hope – CSI: Crime Scene Investigation (Episode: "Killer")
 Bill Roe – Day Break (Episode: "What If They Find Him")
 Gale Tattersall – House (Episode: "Meaning")

Outstanding Achievement in Cinematography in Television Movie, Miniseries, or Pilot
 John Stokes – Nightmares & Dreamscapes: From the Stories of Stephen King (Episode: "Umney's Last Case")
 Thomas Del Ruth – Studio 60 on the Sunset Strip (Episode: "Pilot")
 Adam Kane – Heroes (Episode: "Genesis")
 Walt Lloyd – The Librarian: Return to King Solomon's Mines
 Bill Roe – Day Break (Episode: "Pilot")

References

2006 film awards
Cinematographers
2006 television awards
2006 awards in the United States